Decatopseustis cataphanes is a moth of the family Gelechiidae. It was described by Ian Francis Bell Common in 1958. It is found in Australia, where it has been recorded from the Australian Capital Territory.

References

Moths described in 1958
Pexicopiini